The 26 cantons of Switzerland are the member states of the Swiss Confederation.

The term  has been widely used since the 19th century.

The number of cantons was increased to 19 with the Act of Mediation (1803), with the recognition of former subject territories as full cantons. The Federal Treaty of 1815 increased the number to 22 due to the accession of former associates of the Old Swiss Confederacy. The canton of Jura acceded as the 23rd canton with its secession from Bern in 1979. The official number of cantons was increased to 26 in the federal constitution of 1999, which designated former half-cantons as cantons.

The areas of the cantons vary from 37 km (15 sq. mi.) (canton of Basel-Stadt) to 7,105 km (2743 sq. mi.) (canton of the Grisons); the populations (as of 2018) range from 16,000 (canton of Appenzell Innerrhoden) to 1.5 million (canton of Zürich).

Terminology
The term canton, now also used as the English term for administrative subdivisions of other countries, originates in French usage in the late 15th century (recorded in Fribourg in 1467), from a word for "edge, corner", at the time the literal translation of Early Modern High German .
After 1490,  was increasingly used in French and Italian documents to refer to the members of the Swiss Confederacy. English use of canton in reference to the Swiss Confederacy (as opposed to the heraldic sense) dates to the early 17th century.

In the Old Swiss Confederacy, the term  was in use from the early 15th century as a generic term for the member cantons. The founding cantons specifically were also known as  'forest settlements'.
 was increasingly replaced by  'estate' about 1550, a term taken to imply liberty and sovereignty. Abolished in the Helvetic Republic, the term 'Stand' was revived in 1815 and remains in use today. 

Only with the Act of Mediation of 1803 did German  become an official designation, retained in the Swiss Constitution of 1848.

The term  remains in synonymous usage and is reflected in the name of the upper chamber of the Swiss Parliament, the Council of States.

In the modern era, since Neuchâtel ceased to be a principality in 1848, all Swiss cantons can be considered to have a republican form of government. Some cantons formally describe themselves as republics in their constitutions. This applies to the Romance-speaking cantons in particular:
Geneva (formally , 'Republic and canton of Geneva'), Jura, Neuchâtel, Valais, Vaud and Ticino.

History 

In the 16th century, the Old Swiss Confederacy was composed of 13 sovereign confederate allies (the Thirteen Cantons), and there were two different kinds: five rural states – Uri, Schwyz (which became eponymous of the confederacy), Unterwalden, Glarus, Appenzell – and eight urban states – Zürich, Bern, Luzern, Zug, Basel, Fribourg, Solothurn, Schaffhausen.

Though they were technically part of the Holy Roman Empire, they had become de facto independent when the Swiss defeated Emperor Maximilian I in 1499 in Dornach.

In the early modern period, the individual confederate allies came to be seen as republics; while the six traditional allies had a tradition of direct democracy in the form of the Landsgemeinde, the urban states operated via representation in city councils, de facto oligarchic systems dominated by families of the patriciate.

The old system was abandoned with the formation of the Helvetic Republic following the French invasion of Switzerland in 1798. The cantons of the Helvetic Republic had merely the status of an administrative subdivision with no sovereignty. The Helvetic Republic collapsed within five years, and cantonal sovereignty was restored with the Act of Mediation of 1803. The status of Switzerland as a federation of states was restored, at the time including 19 cantons (the six accessions to the early modern Thirteen Cantons being composed of former associates and subject territories: St. Gallen, Grisons, Aargau, Thurgau, Ticino, Vaud). Three additional western cantons, Valais, Neuchâtel and Geneva, acceded in 1815.

The process of "Restoration", completed by 1830, returned most of the former feudal rights to the cantonal patriciates, leading to rebellions among the rural population. The Radicals embodied these democratic forces calling for a new federal constitution. This tension, paired with religious issues ("Jesuit question") escalated into armed conflict in the 1840s, with the brief Sonderbund War. The victory of the Liberal-Radicals resulted in the formation of Switzerland as a federal state in 1848. The cantons retained far-reaching sovereignty but were no longer allowed to maintain individual standing armies or international relations. As the revolutions of 1848 in Western Europe had failed elsewhere, Switzerland during the later 19th century (and with the exception of the French Third Republic, until the end of World War I) found itself as an isolated democratic republic, surrounded by the restored monarchies of France, Italy, Austria-Hungary and Germany.

Constitutions and powers

The Swiss Federal Constitution declares the cantons to be sovereign to the extent that their sovereignty is not limited by federal law. Areas specifically reserved to the Confederation are the armed forces, currency, the postal service, telecommunications, immigration into and emigration from the country, granting asylum, conducting foreign relations with sovereign states, civil and criminal law, weights and measures, and customs duties.

Each canton has its own constitution, legislature, executive, police and courts. Similar to the Confederation, a directorial system of government is followed by the cantons.

The cantonal legislatures are unicameral parliaments, with their size varying between 58 and 200 seats. A few legislatures also involve or did involve general popular assemblies known as Landsgemeinden; the use of this form of legislature has declined: at present, it exists only in the cantons of Appenzell Innerrhoden and Glarus. The cantonal executives consist of either five or seven members, depending on the canton. For the names of the institutions, see the list of cantonal executives and list of cantonal legislatures.

The cantons retain all powers and competencies not delegated to the Confederation by the federal constitution or law: most significantly the cantons are responsible for healthcare, welfare, law enforcement, public education, and retain the power of taxation. Each canton defines its official language(s). Cantons may conclude treaties not only with other cantons but also with foreign states (respectively Articles 48 and 56 of the Federal Constitution).

The cantonal constitutions determine the internal organisation of the canton, including the degree of autonomy accorded to the municipalities, which varies but almost always includes the power to levy taxes and pass municipal laws; some municipalities have their own police forces.

As at the federal level, all cantons provide for some form of direct democracy. Citizens may demand a popular vote to amend the cantonal constitution or laws or to veto laws or spending bills passed by the parliament. Other than in the instances of general popular assemblies in Appenzell Innerrhoden and Glarus, democratic rights are exercised by secret ballot. The right of foreigners to vote varies by canton, as does whether Swiss citizens living abroad (and registered to vote in a canton) can take part in cantonal voting.

Swiss citizens are citizens of a particular municipality (the place of origin) and the canton in which that municipality is part. Cantons, therefore, have a role in and set requirements for the granting of citizenship (naturalisation), though the process is typically undertaken at a municipal level and is subject to federal law.

Switzerland has only one federal public holiday (1 August); public holidays otherwise vary from canton to canton.

List 
The cantons are listed in their order of precedence given in the federal constitution. This reflects the historical order of precedence of the Eight Cantons in the 15th century, followed by the remaining cantons in the order of their historical accession to the confederacy.

The two-letter abbreviations for Swiss cantons are widely used, e.g. on car license plates. They are also used in the ISO 3166-2 codes of Switzerland with the prefix "CH-" ( — Helvetian Confederation —  having been the ancient Roman name of the region). CH-SZ, for example, is used for the canton of Schwyz.

Half-cantons
Six of the 26 cantons are traditionally, but no longer officially, called "half-cantons". In two instances (Basel and Appenzell) this was a consequence of a historic division, whilst in the case of Unterwalden a historic mutual association, resulted in three pairs of half-cantons. The other 20 cantons were, and in some instances still are—though only in a context where it is needed to distinguish them from any half-cantons—typically termed "full" cantons in English.<ref>Bhagwan and Bhushan" (2009) World Constitutions - A Comparative Study - Ninth Edition (page 311)</ref>

The first article of the 1848 and 1874 constitutions constituted the Confederation as the union of "twenty-two sovereign cantons", referring to the half-cantons as "Unterwalden ( [‘above and beneath the woods’])", "Basel ( [‘city and country’])" and "Appenzell ( [‘both Rhoden’])". 
The 1874 constitution was amended to list 23 cantons with the accession of the Canton of Jura in 1978.

The historic half-cantons, and their pairings, are still recognizable in the first article of the Swiss Federal Constitution of 1999 by being joined to their other "half" with the conjunction "and":

The 1999 constitutional revision retained the traditional distinction, on the request of the six cantonal governments, as a way to mark the historic association of the half-cantons to each other. While the older constitutions referred to these states as "half-cantons", a term that remains in popular use, the 1999 revision and official terminology since then use the appellation "cantons with half of a cantonal vote".

The , 1 and 2 francs coins as minted since 1874 represent the number of cantons by 22 stars surrounding the figure of Helvetia on the obverse.
The design of the coins was altered to show 23 stars, including Jura, beginning with the 1983 batch. The design has remained unchanged since, and does not reflect the official number of "26 cantons" introduced in 1999.

The reasons for the existence of the three pairs of half-cantons are varied:

 Unterwalden never consisted of a single unified jurisdiction. Originally, Obwalden, Nidwalden, and the Abbey of Engelberg formed distinct communities. The collective term Unterwalden remains in use, however, for the area that partook in the creation of the original Swiss confederation in 1291 with Uri and Schwyz. The Federal Charter of 1291 called for representatives from each of the three "areas".Pacte fédéral du 1er août 1291  sur Cliotexte
 The historical canton of Appenzell divided itself into "inner" and "outer" halves (Rhoden) as a consequence of the Reformation in Switzerland in 1597: Appenzell Innerrhoden (Catholic) and Appenzell Ausserrhoden (Protestant).
 The historical canton of Basel was divided in 1833 after the Basel countryside (which became the canton of Basel-Landschaft) declared its independence from the city of Basel (which became the canton of Basel-Stadt), following a period of protest and armed conflict about the under-representation of the more populous countryside in the canton's political system.

With their original circumstances of partition now a historical matter, the half-cantons are since 1848 equal to the other cantons in all but two respects:

 They elect only one member of the Council of States instead of two (Cst. art. 150 par. 2). This means there are a total of 46 seats in the council.
 In popular referendums about constitutional amendments, which require for adoption a national popular majority as well as the assent of a majority of the cantons ( / ), the result of the half-cantons' popular vote counts only one half of that of the other cantons (Cst. arts. 140, 142). This means that for purposes of a constitutional referendum, at least 12 out of a total of 23 cantonal popular votes must support the amendment.

Between 1831 and 1833 the canton of Schwyz was divided into half-cantons: (Inner) Schwyz and the break-away Outer Schwyz; in this instance, the half-cantons were forced by the Confederation to settle their disputes and reunite.

In the 20th century, some Jura separatists suggested a new canton of Jura to be divided into half-cantons of North Jura and South Jura. Instead, North Jura became the (full) canton of Jura while South Jura remains in the canton of Bern as the region of Bernese Jura.

 Names in national languages 
The name of each canton in its own official language is shown in bold.

Admission of new cantons

The enlargement of Switzerland by way of the admission of new cantons ended in 1815. The latest formal attempt considered by Switzerland was in 1919 from Vorarlberg but subsequently rejected. A few representatives submitted in 2010 a parliamentary motion to consider enlargement although it was widely seen as anti-EU rhetoric rather than a serious proposal. The motion was eventually dropped and not even examined by the parliament.

See also

 Cantonal bank
 Cantonal police
 
 Flags and arms of cantons of Switzerland
 List of Swiss cantons by GDP
 List of cantons of Switzerland by elevation

 Notes 

 References 
 Citations 

 Sources 
 Works cited

 . Cited as Ehrenzeller.
  Cited as Häfelin''.

External links

 Swissworld.org – The cantons of Switzerland
 Swisskarte.ch – Maps of the Cantons of Switzerland
 GeoPuzzleAssemble cantons on a Swiss map
 BadacDatabase on Swiss cantons and cities 

 
Subdivisions of Switzerland
Cantons
Switzerland 1
Cantons, Switzerland
Lists of populated places in Switzerland